Etola is a Finnish family company. Typical field of activity includes hydraulics, vulcanized rubber, plastic, tape and building materials.

The company's revenue was €390 million euros as of 2018.

Etola yhtiöt is organized as a group of companies.

History
The company was established by Johan August Etholén in the early 1930s.

Sectors

Plastics 
 Okartek Oy
 Etra Engineering Plastic
 Foiltek Oy
 Thermoplast Oy

Hydraulics 
  Oy
 Euro-Hydro Oy
 Jon-Hydro Oy
 Flexo-Tekniikka Oy Ab
 Hytaflex

Fastening equipments 
 Pameto|Pameto Oy Ab
 Pameto Production
 Pameto Electronics
 Pameto / Suomen pultti

Seals 
 Tiivistekeskus Oy
 Tiivistetekniikka Oy

Others 
 Etra Electronics Oy
 Euro-Kumi Oy 
 Kumipalvelu Oy, safety gloves
 Etra Tapes and Electrical Solutions
 Hitsisalo Oy
 Kone Pajula Oy
 Rusanen Tekstiilipalvelut Oy
 Canter Oy

Foreign countries 
 Baltic states: Baltflex As, Etra Baltic
 Sweden: Tätringen Tekniska
 China: Etola Industrial Products

References

External links
 

Manufacturing companies of Finland
Manufacturing companies established in 1932
Family-owned companies